Alfredo Santos Blanco (26 August 1924 – 10 November 2004) was a Spanish politician who served as Minister of Industry of Spain between 1974 and 1975, during the Francoist dictatorship.

References

1924 births
2004 deaths
Industry ministers of Spain
Government ministers during the Francoist dictatorship